Vanguard was a VSTi and AU software synthesizer created by Canadian independent publisher reFX and Markus Krause from Tone2 Audio.

Production 
Released in 2004, Vanguard was a virtual analog synthesizer with three oscillators, 32 waveforms, up to 10-times unison, a filter with several frequency responses, delay, and reverb effects, and stereo pattern controlled noise gate and arpeggiator. Most functions could be automated, such as cutoff frequencies, resonance, ADSR, and LFO. Vanguard worked with any VST-capable host and featured the Trancegate and Arpeggiator tools. A majority of the audio engine and 128 factory sounds were programmed by Markus Krause from Tone2 Audio software.Some Vanguard sound packs were designed by Manuel Schleis.

Discontinuation and current use
Vanguard was discontinued in 2016. The software can still be downloaded from the reFX website for existing licensed users and can still be played through any DAW that supports 32-bit or 64-bit plugins, namely FL Studio. 

Vanguard is used by many  electronic dance music producers, despite not remaining as prevalent as reFX's Nexus 4 ROM plugin. Vanguard is considered to be an impressive and straightforward synth amongst many producers.

Revival 
In late 2022, reFX announced they had revived the Vanguard synthesizer as Vanguard 2 with an updated vector-based user interface, in addition to new wavetables, filter types, delay, reverb and distortion effects and other modulation features.

References

External links 
refx.com - manufacturer's website
tone2.com - developer of the audio engine

Software synthesizers